Northway is a suburban area in northeast Oxford, England, just inside the Oxford ring road. It is close to Headington Hill and with it forms a ward in Oxford. It mainly consists of social housing built by Oxford City Council in the 1950s, though many houses and apartments are now in private ownership.

There is a Community Centre in Dora Carr Close and a Sports Centre in Maltfield Road.
There is a Northway Evangelical Church.

To the southwest is Headley Way and to the northwest is Marsh Lane.
To the northeast is the Northern Bypass of the ring road.
To the southeast is the John Radcliffe Hospital, the main hospital in Oxford.

References

Areas of Oxford